Mike Shuster is an American journalist and blogger. He is currently the executive producer of The Great War Project, a website examining the impact of World War I on our world, a century after it ended. He was previously a diplomatic correspondent and a roving foreign correspondent for National Public Radio in the United States.

Career 

From 1969 until 1975, Shuster was a photographer and editor at Liberation News Service in New York, a supplier of reports, photos, and graphics for the underground press in the United States. In 1970 and 1976 Shuster traveled around Africa, working as a freelance foreign affairs reporter. His reporting trip in 1970 culminated in a three-week visit to the liberated zones of Guinea-Bissau, a former Portuguese colony. Several years later he spent half a year reporting on Angola. At the time Angola was the scene of a war involving three factions fighting for power in the post-colonial African territory

Between 1975 and 1980, Shuster was a United Nations correspondent for Pacifica News Service where he covered the election of Robert Mugabe in 1980 in Zimbabwe.

Shuster joined NPR in 1980 as a freelance reporter where he was responsible for covering business and the economy. He remained at NPR for 30 years, based at NPR West located in Culver City, California.  As a foreign correspondent, he has reported from Tehran, Islamabad, Berlin, Moscow, and Israel and the West Bank. He witnessed the fall of the Berlin Wall in 1989, covered the U.S. invasion of Iraq, and reported on armed conflicts in Georgia and other former republics of the Soviet Union.

Honors and awards 
Shuster has won a number of awards which include:
Peabody Award for his team's coverage of September 11
Alfred I. duPont-Columbia University Awards for coverage of the Iraq War (2007 and 2004); September 11 and the war in Afghanistan (2003); and the Gulf War (1992)
Overseas Press Club Lowell Thomas Award in 2003 for "The Middle East: A Century of Conflict"
First in Documentary Reporting from the National Headliner Awards
Honorable mention from the Overseas Press Club in 1999
SAJA Journalism Award in 1998

References

External links 
 Mike Shuster, NPR Biography
 Recent stories by Mike Shuster

Year of birth missing (living people)
Living people